Everchanger is the debut studio album by American progressive metalcore band Invent Animate. The album was released on August 26, 2014, through Tragic Hero Records. The album was produced by Brian Hood (Being As An Ocean, Gideon, The Crimson Armada) and Jesse Cash of Erra. The band filmed a music video for "Nocturne: Lost Faith" that was released on July 22, 2014.<ref>Chichester, Sammi. (2014-07-22)."Invent, Animate premiere new music video- Nocturne:Lost Faith". Revolver Mag. Retrieved 2016-02-19.</ref>

In an interview with Highwire Daze, vocalist Ben English discusses the background behind Everchanger''

"The album really touches base on how the world constantly changes. You can’t ever rely on one thing because everything constantly changes. No matter what you’re doing in life. Everchanger is like a way of wrapping it all up into one thing and titling it. It touches all points of major changes that we go through and talks about all the different things I’ve personally been through and even some of the guys in the band."

The album is also the only and last to feature guitarist Logan Forrest before his departure from the band in late 2015.

Track listing

References

2014 debut albums
Tragic Hero Records albums
Invent, Animate albums